Constitution House of Isfahan, also known as Khaneh Mashrouteh or Khaneh Haj Aqa Nourrollah, is a historical edifice located next to the Great Naqsh-e Jahan Square, on Neshat Ave in Isfahan, Iran. During the years that led to the Persian Constitutional Revolution. Afterwards the house was used as a gathering place of the leaders, activists and sympathizers of the movement. The address of constitution house is No. 14 Neshat Ave.

Later this house became a historical museum about the constitution period in Iran. It is called a constitution because it belonged to Haj Aqa Nourollah. It exhibits historical documents, and photographs from the period.

History

Safa Khaneh was built by Haj Aqa Nouroollah and his older brother. Muslims and Christians came here to talk about their religions with each other. It was one of the first interfaith centers in the world. Later a magazine published based on these dialogues was released in Iran, India and London. Later it became an Islamic hospital delivering care without charge. It then became a qeraat khane, (place for reading) where the staff read newspaper aloud for visitors. About 100 years ago it became an Islamic company that produced clothing.

One of the most interesting parts of the house is the basement. It displays 100 of  Isfahan's newspapers from various era.

Gallery

External links

https://irpersiatour.com/blog/constitutional-house-of-isfahan-lets-get-to-know-this-beauty/

Buildings and structures in Isfahan
Museums in Isfahan